Flying Teapot is the third studio album by the progressive rock band Gong, originally released by Virgin Records in May 1973. It was the second entry in the Virgin catalogue (V2002) and was released on the same day as the first, Mike Oldfield's Tubular Bells (V2001). It was re-issued in 1977, with different cover art, by BYG Actuel in France and Japan. Recorded at Virgin's Manor Studios, in Oxfordshire, England, it was produced by Giorgio Gomelsky and engineered by "Simon Sandwitch 2 aided by Tom Zen" (Simon Heyworth and Tom Newman).

Subtitled Radio Gnome Invisible, Part 1, it is the first of the Radio Gnome Invisible trilogy of albums, followed by Angel's Egg in December and You the following October. This trilogy forms a central part of the Gong mythology. The Flying Teapot idea itself was influenced by Russell's teapot. It was the first Gong album to feature English guitarist Steve Hillage, although he contributed relatively little as he arrived late in the recording process. According to Daevid Allen, "Steve Hillage arrived eventually, but there wasn't a lot of space left. He played some rhythmick wa wa [sic], some jazzy chords and a spacey solo [on 'Zero the Hero'.]"

In the Q & Mojo Classic Special Edition Pink Floyd & The Story of Prog Rock, the album came #35 in its list of "40 Cosmic Rock Albums".

Track listing

Personnel 
The original personnel listing is as follows:
Pon voicebox – Dingo Virgin & Hi T Moonweed the favourite
Orgone box & space whisper – the Good Witch Yoni
VCS3box Cynthia size A & crystal machine – Hi T Moonweed the favourite
Split sax i.e. tenna & soprasox & so flooth – The Good Count Bloomdido Bad De Grasse
Gitbox – Stevie Hillside (spermguitar & slow whale), The Submarine Captain (sidereal slideguitar & Dogfoot), Dingo Virgin & others (aluminium croonguitar & stumblestrum)
VCS3 fertilised elect piano & left bank uptightright pno & Shakesperian meat bass – Francis Bacon
Drumbox kicks and knocks – Lawrence the alien
Congox – Rachid Whoarewe the Treeclimber
Road crew & trux – Venux De Luxe (switch doctor), Wiz De Kid (lights) & Duke

These pseudonyms, in turn, represented:
Daevid Allen – vocals, guitar
Gilli Smyth – space whisper
Tim Blake – synthesizer, vocals
Didier Malherbe – saxes, flute
Steve Hillage – guitar
Christian Tritsch – guitar
Francis Moze – bass guitar, piano
Laurie Allan – drums
Rachid Houari – congas
Francis Linon – live sound mixing
"Wiz De Kid" – lighting technician
"Duke" – roadie

References

1973 albums
Concept albums
Gong (band) albums
Albums produced by Giorgio Gomelsky
Progressive rock albums by British artists
Space rock albums